Rojavin Raja is a 1976 Indian Tamil-language film, directed by  K. Vijayan and produced by N. V. Ramasamy. The film stars Sivaji Ganesan, Vanisri, A. V. M. Rajan and Cho. It was released on 15 December 1976.

Plot 

Raja is the poor son of a teacher. Gopal is his rich best friend that often helps him financially. Janaki is the only child of a rich man and falls in love with Raja. Her father objects as Raja is poor and arranges her marriage with Gopal. Raja is stuck between the wanting to be with the woman he loves and his best friend's happiness.

Cast 
Sivaji Ganesan as Raja
Vanisri as Janaki
A. V. M. Rajan as Gopal
Major Sundarrajan as Selvanayakam
Srikanth as Thiyagu
R. S. Manohar as Singapur Rasappa
S. Varalakshmi as Gopal's mother
Kumari Rukmani as Visalam
Sukumari as Amirtham
V. K. Ramasamy
Cho as Jambu
Suruli Rajan
Manorama
Neelu as the college professor
C.I.D Sakunthala as Nirmala
Senthamarai as Singapur Rasappa's assistant

Soundtrack 
The music was composed by M. S. Viswanathan. All songs written by Kannadasan.

References

External links 
 

1970s Tamil-language films
1976 films
Films directed by K. Vijayan
Films scored by M. S. Viswanathan